The Emporia State University School of Business is a public business school located on the main campus of the Emporia State University in Emporia, Kansas that is accredited by the Association to Advance Collegiate Schools of Business, and was founded in 1917.

Student organizations and programs
There are seven student organizations for School of Business students to be involved in, several of which include fraternities or sororities.
 Beta Alpha Psi
 Beta Gamma Sigma
 IS Club
 MBA Association
 Phi Beta Lambda
 Pi Omega Pi
 Marketing Club
 Enactus

Koch Center for Leadership and Ethics
The Koch Center for Leadership and Ethics focuses on the ethics within the business world. The School of Business received a quarter of a million dollar grant from the Fred and Mary Koch Foundation and Koch Industries.

Small Business Development Center
The Small Business Development Center trains students and the public on how to start a business.

School of Business Mentor Program
The program lets students learn from experienced professionals while preparing for life after college.

Notable alumni

 William Coffin Coleman – founder of Coleman Company. Taught school at Ottawa University for a year before serving as principal of Blue Rapids schools for a year. Coleman also served as mayor of Wichita in 1923 and 1924.

References

External links
 

Emporia State University
Business schools in Kansas
1868 establishments in Kansas